is a Japanese actor who starred in Kwak Jae-yong's film Cyborg She and in Koizora.

Career

In 2017, Koide admitted to drinking alcohol and having sex with a 17-year-old girl after allegations were published in Friday. He was suspended by his talented agency, Amuse, Inc., a month later. Following his suspension, several acting projects he was involved in removed and recast his roles, including the Netflix series Jimmy: The True Story of a True Idiot. In 2020, he announced that he will make a comeback in acting from his three-year hiatus after the sex scandal. He is under a new agency called "Rhythmedia".

Filmography

Films
Worst by Chance (2003)
Break Through! (2004) - Norio Yoshida
Linda Linda Linda (2005) - Abe
Heavenly Forest (2006) - Kyohei Sekiguchi
Hatsukoi (2006) - Kishi
Koizora (2007)
Kimi ni shika kikoenai (2007) - Shinya Nozaki
Kisaragi  (2007) - Snake
Cyborg She (2008)
Killer Bride's Perfect Crime (2009) - Komine
Gokusen: The Movie (2009)
Rookies (2009)
Run with the Wind (2009)
Nodame Cantabile The Movie (2009)
Nodame Cantabile The Movie II (2010)
The Lightning Tree (2010) - Sukejiro Seta
Surely Someday  (2010) - Takumi
Parade (2010)
When I Kill Myself  (2011) - Warden Yohei Minami
Strawberry Night (2013) - Noriyuki Hayama
The Last Chance: Diary of Comedians (2013) - Koji Komoto
Jūjika (2016) - Yū Sanada
Shin Godzilla (2016)
Traces of Sin (2017)
Haruta & Chika (2017) - Shinjirō Kusakabe
God of War (2017) - Yamagawa
Bridal, My Song (2022)
Ginpei-cho Cinema Blues (2023)
Majo no Kōsui (2023)

Television
Night School (Fuji TV / 2004)
Ranpo R (YTV / 2004) - ep.4
Gokusen 2 (NTV / 2005)
Nodame Cantabile (Fuji TV / 2006)
Oishii Proposal (TBS / 2006)
Love & Farm (Fuji TV / 2007)
The Naminori Restaurant (NTV / 2008)
Rookies (TBS / 2008)
 The Battle of Mr. & Mrs. Sasaki(TBS / 2008)
Jin (TBS / 2009) - Kyotaro Tachibana
Jin 2 (TBS / 2011) - Kyotaro Tachibana
 Perfect Report | Paafekuto ripooto (Fuji TV / 2010) - Shu Akasaka
Umechan Sensei (NHK / 2012) - Takeo (Umeko's older brother)
Strawberry Night (Fuji TV / 2012) - Noriyuki Hayama

References

External links
 
 Keisuke Koide   at HanCinema

21st-century Japanese male actors
Japanese male film actors
Japanese male television actors
1984 births
Living people
Place of birth missing (living people)
Keio University alumni
Amuse Inc. talents
21st-century Japanese singers
21st-century Japanese male singers